Sebastián Gessa y Arias (8 May 1840, Chiclana de la Frontera - 9 January 1920, San Agustín del Guadalix) was a Spanish painter; known as El pintor de las flores, for his dedication to floral themes, bodegones and still-lifes.

Biography
He began his studies at the Escuela de Bellas Artes de Cádiz then, in 1864, received a scholarship that enabled him to study in Paris. There, he enrolled at the École nationale supérieure des Beaux-Arts, where he studied with Alexandre Cabanel. He would remain in Paris until 1870. During that time, he participated in several exhibitions; notably the Exposition Universelle (1867).

Much of this work was floral in nature and set the tone for his career.

In 1881, he was awarded a gold medal at the Exposición Regional de Cádiz and presented his first entry at the National Exhibition of Fine Arts. He was awarded a Third Class medal at the Exposition Universelle (1889). His greatest success came in 1897, at the National Exhibition, when he was awarded a First Class prize for his work "Flowers and Fruits". This was the first time that top honors had been given to a bodegón, rather than one of the dramatic historical or mythological scenes the jurors had favored up to that point.

Several well known painters were trained in his workshop, including Fernanda Frances Arribas, Julia Alcayde y Montoya and Adela Ginés y Ortiz, his favorite student, with whom he lived, after becoming financially distressed. Her death from pneumonia, in 1918, left him destitute.

References

Further reading
 Sebastián Gessa Arias. El Pintor De Las Flores, exhibition catalog, Ayuntamiento De Chiclana De La Frontera, 2004

External links

More works by Gessa @ Artnet
An appreciation and biography @ Chiclana Hoy
"Un maestro de pintoras magistrales" by Jesús Romero @ El Periódico de Chiclana

1840 births
1920 deaths
Spanish painters
Spanish still life painters
Spanish floral still life painters
Spanish bodegón painters
People from Chiclana de la Frontera